Achnahannet is a small hamlet and farm estate located near the northwest shore of Loch Ness in Invernesshire, Highland, Scotland. It lies south of Drumnadrochit along the A82 road, just southwest of Lenie and Urquhart Castle.

References

Populated places in Inverness committee area
Highland Estates
Loch Ness